Mario Sanzullo (born 5 June 1993) is an Italian open water swimmer who won two medals at the World Champioinships. He competed at the 2020 Summer Olympics, in 10 km open water.

Biography
On 15 July 2019 Sanzullo had obtained, together with Gregorio Paltrinieri, the qualification for the marathon 10 km of Tokyo 2020, the Olympic Games postponed to 2021 due to the Coronavirus.

Achievements

See also
 Italy at the 2020 Summer Olympics

References

External links
 

1993 births
Living people
Italian male swimmers
Italian male long-distance swimmers
World Aquatics Championships medalists in open water swimming
Swimmers of Fiamme Oro
Medalists at the 2015 Summer Universiade
Universiade bronze medalists for Italy
Universiade medalists in swimming
21st-century Italian people